Sneek Noord is a railway station in Sneek, Netherlands. The station opened on 3 June 1973 and is located on the Leeuwarden–Stavoren railway. The train services are operated by Arriva.

Train services

Bus services

There is no bus service at this station. The nearest bus stop is located at the Leeuwarderweg.

See also
 List of railway stations in Friesland

External links
NS website 
Dutch Public Transport journey planner 

Railway stations in Friesland
Railway stations opened in 1973